Stephen Paul Ludzik (born April 3, 1961) is a Canadian former professional ice hockey player and coach who has worked as a television analyst for The Score television network. He played in the National Hockey League for the Chicago Blackhawks and Buffalo Sabres between 1981 and 1990. He later coached the Tampa Bay Lightning between 1999 and 2001, and also spent several years coaching in the minor leagues.

Biography
As a youth, Ludzik played in the 1974 Quebec International Pee-Wee Hockey Tournament with a minor ice hockey team from Toronto.

He had a distinguished junior career with the Niagara Falls Flyers of the Ontario Hockey League, amassing 125 goals and 233 assists, for a total of 358 points. This broke the career point total record for the Flyers, which still stands today. He was subsequently named to the Flyers' All-Time Five Man All-Star Team.

He was drafted 28th overall by the Chicago Black Hawks in the 1980 NHL Entry Draft. After one more year of junior hockey, Ludzik turned pro in 1981–82. He split that season between the Black Hawks and the American Hockey League's New Brunswick Hawks. The next season, he became a Black Hawk regular.

Ludzik played with the Black Hawks until the 1988–89 season. Except for 11 games with the Buffalo Sabres in 1989–90, he spent the rest of his playing career in the minors. He played in a total of 424 NHL games and scored 46 goals and 93 assists.

Coaching
After retiring as a player, Ludzik turned to coaching, starting in the IHL with the Muskegon Fury and then the Detroit Vipers, where he won the 1996-97 Turner Cup with General Manager Rick Dudley. He then spent two years as head coach of the Tampa Bay Lightning, but was let go after the 2000–01 season. He subsequently went to the OHL as head coach of the Mississauga IceDogs, and then to the AHL, where he ended his coaching career in 2004–05 with the San Antonio Rampage.

Career statistics

Regular season and playoffs

NHL coaching career

Other leagues

Broadcasting and publishing
Since coaching, Ludzik has been a hockey pundit on television, most notably on The Score Television Network. He also co-authored a book, entitled "Been There, Done That".

Parkinson's disease
Ludzik came public in 2012 that he has Parkinson's disease and was diagnosed in 2000.

References

External links

1961 births
Living people
Buffalo Sabres players
Canadian expatriate ice hockey players in Austria
Canadian ice hockey coaches
Canadian ice hockey centres
Canadian people of Polish descent
Canadian television sportscasters
Chicago Blackhawks draft picks
Chicago Blackhawks players
EK Zell am See players
Florida Panthers coaches
Mississauga IceDogs coaches
Montreal Canadiens scouts
New Brunswick Hawks players
Niagara Falls Flyers players
Rochester Americans players
Saginaw Hawks players
Sportspeople from Etobicoke
Ice hockey people from Toronto
Tampa Bay Lightning coaches